Terrion Jamar Ware (born March 31, 1986) is an American mixed martial artist who competed in the Bantamweight division of the Ultimate Fighting Championship.

Background

Growing up in Los Angeles, Terrion's original dream was to play for the Los Angeles Dodgers. Ware was signed by the Los Angeles Angels out of college and played in their minor league system. He made it all the way to their Single A team, Rancho Cucamonga Quakes, as a centerfielder but he had to give up on baseball due to an arm injury he originally suffered in college.

Mixed martial arts career

Early career

Starting his MMA career in 2012, Ware fought for various regional American promotions, compiling a 17–5 record while winning the BAMMA USA Bantamweight Championship against Eric Winston, and defending it once against Jeff Martin, as well as the California Xtreme Fighting Bantamweight Championship against Jared Papazian. Other memorable fights during this time were his fight against Leandro Higo at RFA 29 on August 21, 2015, which he lost via last second rear-naked choke at the end of round 3. He also fought for the Absolute Championship Berkut promotion at ACB 51: Silva vs. Torgeson. At this event he won against Nick Mamalis via unanimous decision.

Ultimate Fighting Championship

In his UFC debut, Ware faced Cody Stamann on July 8, 2017, at UFC 213 in Las Vegas. He lost the fight by unanimous decision.

Terrion faced promotional newcomer Sean O'Malley on December 1, 2017 at The Ultimate Fighter 26 Finale.  He lost the fight via unanimous decision.

Ware faced Tom Duquesnoy on March 17, 2018 at UFC Fight Night 127. He lost the fight by unanimous decision.

Terrion Ware faced Merab Dvalishvili on September 15, 2018 at UFC Fight Night: Hunt vs. Oleinik. He lost the fight via unanimous decision.

Following his fourth straight loss, Ware was released from the UFC.

Post UFC

Following his release, Terrion's first fight outside of the UFC was against Jordan Winski at Cage Fury Fighting Championships 75 on May 25, 2019. He lost the fight via split decision. 

Terrion's next fight was against Denis Purić at Fight Night 11: Lethbridge on September 28, 2019 for the ZF Bantamweight Championship. He lost the fight via split decision.

After almost a 3 year lay off, Ware faced Anthony Jimenez on May 21, 2022 at UNF 1. He won the bout via rear-naked choke in the third round.

Ware faced Albert Morales for the UNF Featherweight Championship on August 20, 2022 at UNF 2. He lost the bout via arm-triangle choke in the third round.

Championships and accomplishments

Mixed martial arts

BAMMA USA
 BU Bantamweight Championship. (one time)
One successful title defense

California Xtreme Fighting
CXF Bantamweight Championship (one time)

Mixed martial arts record

|-
|Loss
|align=center|18–12
|Albert Morales
|Submission (arm-triangle choke)
|UNF 2
|
|align=center|3
|align=center|1:28
|Commerce, California, United States
|
|-
|Win
|align=center|18–11
|Anthony Jimenez
|Submission (rear-naked choke)
|UNF 1
|
|align=center|3
|align=center|1:41
|Burbank, California, United States
|
|-
| Loss
| align=center| 17–11
| Denis Purić
| Decision (split)
| Fight Night 11: Lethbridge
| 
| align=center| 3
| align=center| 5:00
| Lethbridge, Canada
| 
|-
| Loss
| align=center| 17–10
| Jordan Winski
| Decision (split)
| Cage Fury Fighting Championships 75
| 
| align=center| 3
| align=center| 5:00
| Coachella, California, United States
| 
|-
|Loss
|align=center|17–9
|Merab Dvalishvili
|Decision (unanimous)
|UFC Fight Night: Hunt vs. Oleinik
|
|align=center|3
|align=center|5:00
|Moscow, Russia
|
|-
|Loss
|align=center|17–8
|Tom Duquesnoy
|Decision (unanimous)
|UFC Fight Night: Werdum vs. Volkov
|
|align=center|3
|align=center|5:00
|London, England
|
|-
|Loss
|align=center|17–7
|Sean O'Malley
|Decision (unanimous)
|The Ultimate Fighter: A New World Champion Finale
|December 1, 2017
|align=center|3
|align=center|5:00
|Las Vegas, Nevada, United States
|
|-
|Loss
|align=center|17–6
|Cody Stamann
|Decision (unanimous)
|UFC 213
|
|align=center|3
|align=center|5:00
|Las Vegas, Nevada, United States
|
|-
| Win
| align=center| 17–5
| Jared Papazian
| KO (punch)
| CXF 7: Locked and Loaded
| 
| align=center| 3
| align=center| 0:20
| Studio City, California, United States
|
|-
| Win
| align=center| 16–5
| Nick Mamalis
| Decision (unanimous)
| ACB 51: Silva vs. Torgeson
| 
| align=center| 3
| align=center| 5:00
| Irvine, California, United States
|
|-
| Win
| align=center| 15–5
| Marvin Blumer
| Decision (unanimous)
| RFA 40
| 
| align=center| 3
| align=center| 5:00
| Prior Lake, Minnesota, United States
| 
|-
| Win
| align=center| 14–5
| Rob Gooch
| Decision (unanimous)
| CXF 2: Gold Rush
| 
| align=center| 3
| align=center| 5:00
| Studio City, California, United States
| 
|-
| Loss
| align=center| 13–5
| Leandro Higo
| Submission (rear-naked choke)
| RFA 29
| 
| align=center| 3
| align=center| 4:58
| Sioux Falls, South Dakota, United States
| 
|-
| Loss
| align=center| 13–4
| Luke Sanders
|Decision (unanimous)
|Legacy FC vs. RFA Superfight Card
|
|align=center|5
|align=center|5:00
|Robinsonville, Mississippi, United States
|
|-
| Win
| align=center| 13–3
| Joe Murphy
| Decision (unanimous)
|RFA 23
|
|align=center|3
|align=center|5:00
|Costa Mesa, California, United States
|
|-
| Win
| align=center|12–3
| Jeff Martin
| TKO (punches)
| BAMMA USA: Badbeat 13
| 
| align=center| 4
| align=center|1:47
| Commerce, California, United States
| 
|-
| Loss
| align=center| 11–3
| Joe Soto
| Submission (north-south choke)
| Tachi Palace Fights 20
| 
| align=center| 3
| align=center| 2:48  
| Lemoore, California, United States
| 
|-
| Win
| align=center| 11–2
| Eric Winston
|Decision (unanimous)
|BAMMA USA: Badbeat 12
|
|align=center|3
|align=center|5:00
|Commerce, California, United States
|
|-
| Win
| align=center| 10–2
| Zac Chavez
| Submission (rear-naked choke)
| RFA 12
| 
|align=center| 2
|align=center| 3:58
| Los Angeles, California, United States
|
|-
| Win
| align=center|9–2
| Kevin Michel
| Submission (triangle choke)
| KOTC: Terrified
| 
| align=center|1
| align=center|4:26
| Highland, California, United States
|
|-
| Win
| align=center|8–2
| German Baltazar
| Decision (split)
| BAMMA USA: Pro Series 3
| 
| align=center|3
| align=center|5:00
| Tarzana, California, United States
|
|-
| Win
| align=center|7–2
| Octavio Morales
| Submission (choke)
| MEZ Sports: Pandemonium 9
| 
| align=center|2
| align=center|3:12
| Mission Viejo, California, United States
|
|-
| Win
| align=center|6–2
| Bobby Sanchez
| KO (punch)
| BAMMA USA: Bad Beat 9
| 
| align=center|1
| align=center|0:48
| Commerce, California, United States
|
|-
| Loss
| align=center| 5–2
| Jared Papazian
| Decision (unanimous)
| BAMMA USA: Bad Beat 8
| 
| align=center| 3
| align=center| 5:00
| Commerce, California, United States
|
|-
| Win
| align=center| 5–1
| Paul Amaro
| Decision (unanimous)
| IFS 13
|
| align=center| 3
| align=center| 5:00
|La Puente, California, United States
| 
|-
| Win
| align=center| 4–1
| Marvin Madariaga
| Decision (split)
| BAMMA USA: Badbeat 7
| 
| align=center| 3
| align=center| 5:00
| Commerce, California, United States
| 
|-
| Win
| align=center| 3–1
| John Sassone
| KO
| IFS 12
| 
| align=center| 1
| align=center| 1:47
| La Puente, California, United States
| 
|-
| Win
| align=center| 2–1
| Justin Santistevan
| KO (punch)
| CITC 11
| 
| align=center| 1
| align=center| 2:38
| Lancaster, California, United States
| 
|-
| Loss
| align=center| 1–1
| Paul Amaro
| Submission (guillotine choke)
| Samurai MMA Pro 3
| 
| align=center| 3
| align=center| 2:09
| Culver City, California, United States
|
|-
| Win
| align=center| 1–0
| John Sassone
| TKO (punches)
| IFS 11
| 
| align=center| 1
| align=center| 2:29
| Industry, California, United States
|

See also 
 List of male mixed martial artists

References

External links 
  
  

1989 births
Living people
People from Los Angeles
American male karateka
Mixed martial artists utilizing Kyokushin kaikan
American male mixed martial artists
Bantamweight mixed martial artists
Ultimate Fighting Championship male fighters